Usharani (29 May 1958 – 20 June 2020) was an Indian actress who acted mainly in Malayalam films.

Personal life

Usharani married Malayalam movie director N. Sankaran Nair in 1977.

Filmography

Tamil

 Thirumalai Thenkumari (1970)
 Kalam Vellum (1970) as Dhanam
 Muhammad bin Tughluq (1971)
 Jakkamma (1972) as Valli
 Shakthi Leelai (1972) as Saraswathi
 Pattikaattu Ponnaiya (1973) as Kaveri
 Arangetram (1973)
 Gumasthavin Magal (1974) as Vimala
 Kanmani Raja (1974) as Kanchana
 Unnai Suttrum Ulagam (1977) as Rekha
 Odi Vilayadu Thatha (1977) as Savitri
 Ennai Pol Oruvan (1978)
 Puthiya Vaarpugal (1979)
 Neram Vandhachu (1982)
 Sivantha Kangal (1982)
 Mullillatha Roja (1982)
 Naalu Perukku Nandri (1983) 
 Oru Oorla Oru Rajakumari (1995)  
 Valli Vara Pora (1995)  
 Mannava (1997) as Praveen's mother
 Harikrishnans  (1998)
 Raajjiyam (2002) as Janaki's mother

Hindi
 Sabash Ganga Ram

Telugu
 Aalu Magalu (1977) as Radha
 Nija Roopalu (1974)
 Bullet Bullodu (1972)
 Chitti Thalli (1972)

Kannada
 Rajkumar's films (few)

Malayalam

 Mayilattam (2004) as Lakshmiyamma
 The King Maker Leader (2003) as Bharathiyamma
 Varum Varunnu Vannu (2003)
 Niramulla Swapnangal (2002)
 Premaagni (2001) as Renuka Thampuratti
 Thenkasipattanam (2000) as Sangeetha's aunty
 Millenium Stars (2000)
 Nishaasurabhikal (2000)
 Highrange (2000)
 Pathram (1999) as Authakutty's wife
 Amma Ammaayiyamma (1998) as Dhakshayani
 Thirakalkkappuram (1998)
 Kanmadam (1998) as Raakkamma
 Samaantharangal (1998) as Mary
 Oro Viliyum Kathorthu (1998)
 Sisiram (1998)
 Ancharakkalyaanam (1997) as Devakiyamma
 Poonilamazha (1997)
 Shibiram (1997)
 Swarnakireedam (1996) as Devayani 
 Manthrikakuthira (1996) as Rahel
 Mahathma (1996) as Nancy's mother
 Hitler (1996) as Malathi Teacher
 Kanchanam (1996) as Muthassi
 Vaanarasena (1996) as Vishalakshi
 Mazhayethum Munpe (1995) as Fake Mummy
 Indian Military Intelligence (1995) as Mappasu Mariyamma
 Boxer (1995)
 Manashasthranjante Diary (1995)
 Mangala Soothram (1995) as Adv. Maheswariyamma
 Paalayam (1994) as Mariyamma
 Sudhinam (1994) as Teacher
 Rajadhani (1994) as Maniyamma
 Manathe Kottaram (1994) as Kanakam
 Bhaarya (1994) as Sarojini
 Pravachakan (1994)
 Ammayane Sathyam (1993) as Jagannatha Varma's wife
 Sthalathe Pradhana Payyans (1993) as Kurup's wife
 Oru Kadankatha Pole (1993) 
 Kavadiyattam (1993) as Kurup's mother
 Butterflies (1993)
 Ekalavyan (1993) as Mathaji
 Ithu Manjukalam (1993) as Mrs. Anna George
 Padaleeputhram (1993)
 Ellarum Chollanu (1992) as Archana's mother
 Thalastaanam (1992) as Unni's aunt
 Aham (1992) as Achamma Tharakan
 Kallanum Polisum (1992) as Dakshayaniyamma
 Maarathon (Aayaraam Gayaaraam) (1992)
 Agninilavu (1991) as Arya
 Kuruppinte Kanakku Pusthakam (1990) as Beena's sister
 Theruvu Narthaki (1988)
 Cabaret Dancer (1986)
 Ee Yugam (1983) as Ammu
 Kaivarikal Thiriyumbol (1979)
 Madanolsavam (1978)
 Mudramothiram (1978) as Bindu
 Avalude Ravukal (1978) as Radha
 Padmatheertham (1978) as Jameela
 Prarthana (1978)
 Makampiranna Manka (1977)
 Randu Lokam (1977)
 Nirakudam (1977) as Anarkali
 Muttathe Mulla (1977) as Radha
 Harshabhaashpam (1977) as Kochukalyani
 Dheera Sameere Yamuna Theere (1977)
 Bhaaryaavijayam (1977)
 Rowdy Rajamma (1977)
 Theruvugeetham (1977)
 Ayalkkaari (1976) as Elizabeth
 Anaavaranam (1976)
 Surveykkallu (1976)
 Abhinandanam (1976) as Vimala
 Panchami (1976) as Rukku
 Sathyathinte Nizhalil (1975)
 Akkaldaama (1975)
 Aaranyakaandam (1975)
 Chumaduthaangi (1975) as Sugandhi
 Bhaarya Illaatha Raathri (1975)
 Maanyashree Vishwaamithran (1974) as Lathika
 Honeymoon (1974)
 Ankathattu (1974)
 Vrindaavanam (1974)
 Thaniniram (1973) as Vasanthy
 Thottavadi (1973) as Sarasamma 
 Prathidhwani (1971)
 Anaadha Shilpangal (1971) as Ammini
 Naazhikakkallu (1970)
 Ammayenna Sthree (1970) as Malathy
 Ballaatha Pahayan (1969) as Sulekha
 Karthika (1968) as Jaanu (Child artist)
 Manaswini (1968) as Sumangala
 Agniputhri (1967) as Bindhu (Child artist)
 Balyakalasakhi (1967) (Child artist)
 Chithramela (1967)
 Ollathu Mathi (1967)
 Poochakkanni (1966) (Child artist)
 Jail (1966) (Child artist)

TV career
 Swantham Sujatha - (Surya TV) - Malayalam serial - Actress
 Parvathy (Raadan TV) - Malayalam serial - Actress
 Ente Mannu  - Malayalam serial - Actress
 Rani Maharani
 Comedy Stars
 Manam Thurannu
 Sarigama
 Katha Ithuvare
 Asianet News
 On Record
 Njan Ivideyundu
 Samagamam
 Filmy Fridays - Online
 Paragon Chappals

References

Sources

External links

Ushakumari

1958 births
2020 deaths
Actresses in Malayalam cinema
20th-century Indian actresses
Indian film actresses
Actresses in Tamil cinema
Actresses in Telugu cinema
Actresses in Kannada cinema
21st-century Indian actresses
Actresses from Chennai
Actresses in Malayalam television